Josip Bratulić (born 2 February 1939) is a Croatian philologist and a historian of literature and culture.

He was born in Sveti Petar u Šumi. He attended a gymnasium in Pazin, graduating in Croatian studies and comparative literature at the Faculty of Philosophy in Zagreb. At the same university he received his master's degree and a doctorate, with a thesis on Croatian Glagolism. He worked as an assistant and research associate at the Old Church Slavonic Institute in Zagreb, and since 1977 he has been teaching a course on Old Croatian literature at the Zagreb Faculty of Philosophy. He served as a dean in the period 1991-1993, and since 2000 he has been a regular member of the Croatian Academy of Sciences and Arts.

Bratulić participated in the preparation of a large number of cultural and scientific events, such as the exhibition Pisana riječ u Hrvatskoj ("The Written Word in Croatia"), and the development of the ethnopark Glagolitic Alley Roč–Hum together with Želimir Janeš. In the period 1996-2002. he served as the president of Matica hrvatska. His scientific interest is Croatian and Slavic Middle Ages, Croatian Glagolitism, Croatian pre-revival literature and the Croatian cultural peculiarities on the Istrian territory.

Works
Apokrif o prekrasnom Josipu u hrvatskoj književnosti (1972)
Istarski razvod (1978)
Aleja glagoljaša Roč–Hum (1983, 1994)
Žitja Konstantina i Metodija i druga vrela (1985)
Istarske književne teme (1987)
Vinodolski zakon (1988)
Izazov zavičaja (1990)
Sjaj baštine (1990)
Mrvice sa zagrebačkog stola (1994)
Leksikon hrvatske glagoljice (1995)
Hrvatska propovijed (1996)
Hrvatski ex libris, (2007)
Hrvatske autorske čestitke, (2011)

References

1939 births
Living people
People from Sveti Petar u Šumi
Croatian philologists
Croatian literary historians
University of Zagreb alumni
Members of the Croatian Academy of Sciences and Arts